Chandra Nayudu (1933 – 4 April 2021) was an Indian cricketer, cricket commentator, teacher, and author. She was India's first female cricket commentator, as well as one of India's earliest woman cricketers.

Life and family 
Chandra Nayudu was born in 1933. Her father, C. K. Nayudu, was a well-known cricketer and the captain of India's first test cricket team.

Career 
Nayudu graduated with a degree in English, and taught English at a government college in Indore, Madhya Pradesh. Nayudu competed briefly in domestic women's cricket, leading the first Uttar Pradesh women's cricket team, and played cricket for her college, before taking up cricket commentary in the 1970s. She was India's first female cricket commentator. She began her career in commentary in a match between the Madras Cricket Club vs. Bombay in the 1976-77 season, and continued to comment for domestic and international matches in Hindi and English. She was also a commentator during the English team's tour of India in 1979-1980 for India's public broadcaster, All India Radio, and later recorded her experiences in cricket commentary for an interview with cricket historian David Rayvern Allen, archived with Lord's. According to Nayudu, she was the first female international cricket commentator, preceding an Australian woman commentator. In an interview with ESPN Cricinfo, she stated that her interest in cricket commentary began as a way of honoring her father's achievements in cricket.

She was a life member of the Madhya Pradesh Cricket Association, and undertook several efforts to promote women's cricket in the region, including establishing an inter-university tournament. According to her nephew, former cricketer Vijay Nayudu, she created several trophies in memory of her parents for cricket tournaments, including the presentation of a silver bat to the Cricket Club of India, and a collegiate memorial trophy for her mother. In 1995, she published a memoir of her father titled C.K. Nayudu: A Daughter Remembers.

Publications 
 Chandra K. Nayudu, C.K. Nayudu: A Daughter Remembers (New Delhi, Rupa Publications 1995),

References 

1933 births
2021 deaths
Cricket commentators
Indian cricket commentators
Women cricket commentators
Indian women cricketers
Indian women writers